Ian Neal Stevens (born 13 April 1948) is a former New Zealand rugby union player. A halfback and first five-eighth, Stevens represented Wellington at a provincial level, and was a member of the New Zealand national side, the All Blacks, from 1972 to 1976. He played 33 games for the All Blacks, including one as captain, and appeared in three test matches.

References

1948 births
Living people
People from Waipawa
People educated at Palmerston North Boys' High School
New Zealand rugby union players
New Zealand international rugby union players
Wellington rugby union players
Rugby union scrum-halves
Rugby union fly-halves
Rugby union players from the Hawke's Bay Region